The Presbyterian Church in Liberia is a historic church in Liberia in the Presbyterian Reformed tradition. It was formerly a Presbytery of the Cumberland Presbyterian Church, now it is an independent, self-governing denomination.

History 
Liberia was settled by American slaves, before it became a colony. In 1833 the PC(USA) begun to work in Liberia. Liberia was a Republic after a Constitution was adopted in 1847. In 1850 the American Board of Commissioners for Foreign Missions sent missionaries, among them was J. Leighton Wilson.

The church established Alexander High School in Monrovia, Liberia. It is a well known fact in Liberia that a significant number of independence and post independence leaders were leader of the Presbyterian Church or educated in the Alexander School. The Presbytery of Liberia become independent in 1928, and this is also the founding date of this denomination. In 1944 the church started its own mission work in the Todee District. In 1980 the church become a provisional presbytery of the Cumberland Presbyterian Church.

In 2006 in Cheersburg the church decided at its annual Synod to sever all relations with the Cumberland Presbyterian Church, the Synod of Tennessee, put an end to a more than two decade long partnership.

Statistics 
The church has 15 congregations across Liberia and more than 3,000 members.
First Presbyterian Church in Monrovia, Liberia
First Presbyterian Church in Careysburg, Liberia
Evangelical Presbyterian Church in 3rd Street, Sinkor, Liberia
Trinity Presbyterian Church in Paynesville
Yekepa Presbyterian Church in Yekepa City, Liberia
St. Paul Presbyterian Church in Gardnesville Township, Liberia
Gwee Town Presbyterian Church in Todee District, Montserrado County, Liberia
First Presbyterian Church Marshall Margibi County
Faith Presbyterian Church Sinkor, Liberia
Granger Presbyterian Church in Johnsonville Township, Liberia
Croizerville Presbyterian Church in Crozierville, Liberia
St. Marks Presbyterian Church in Fansehn Town, Liberia
Marshall Presbyterian Church in Marshall City, Liberia
First Presbyterian Church Schiefflin in Margibi County, Liberia
Gbarnshue Preaching Point in Zota Clan
New Horizon Presbyterian Church in Harper City, Liberia
Bomi Presbyterian Preaching point in Bomi County, Liberia

The Moderator of the Presbyterian Church is Rev. Sando E. Townsend and the Stated Clerk is Elder David B. Gibson, Jr.
Name of Minister of the Presbyterian Church:
1. Rev. Sando E. Townsend
2. Rev. Aaron C. Smith
3. Rev. Solomon K. Akorsah
4. Rev. Solomon H. Garjaye
5. Rev. G. Boimah Freeman
6. Rev. Plezzant C. Harris
7. Rev. Dave B. G. Kiamu
8. Rev. Sanjee Abioseh Stepter
9. Rev. Sayply Clerk
10. Rev. Emery Ghaicarn 
11. Rev. Sam S. Kwadeh
12. Rev. Robert B. Lee, III
13. Rev. Lester R. Lee
14. Rev. Menwon Shasha
15. Rev. Ishmael Cole
16. Rev. Dwedw G. Townsend
17. Rev. Rita E. Townsend
18. Rev. Lawrence Bayusie
19. Rev. C. Wellington Morgan
20. Rev. Victor E. Helb
21. Rev. Coker A. J. George, Jr
22. Rev. L. Abba Diggs
23. Rev. Augustus T. Turker
24. Rev. C. Vivian Sisuse
25. Rev. Shadrack M'bock
26. Rev. Jerries L. Walker
27. Rev. Ernest Urey
29. Rev. Jackson Targee
30. Rev. Janjay Biamon
31. Rev. varney Boimah
32. Rev. Eugene Olu Eastman
33. Rev. James Lee
34. Rev. Amelia C. Stryker
35. Rev. Richard Ballingggar
36. Rev. George W. Tugbeh
37. Rev. Caesar B. Snyder
38. Rev. Cornelia Greene Mayson
39. Rev. Andrew Kolubah
40. Rev. John Karmo

Names of Candidates/Licentiate:
1. Lic. Victor B. Kromah
2. Lic. David Kollie
3. Lic. Joe P. Sumo 
4. Lic. Edward Peters
5. Lic. David Sumo
6. Lic. John T. Wright

Interchurch relations 
The Presbyterian Church in Liberia is a denominational member of the World Communion of Reformed Churches. The First Presbyterian Church and the Living Water Fellowship Church both in Monrovia, Liberia are congregational members of the World Reformed Fellowship.

References

External links 
 Official Website

Presbyterian denominations in Africa
Presbyterianism in Liberia
Members of the World Communion of Reformed Churches
Christian organizations established in 1928